Three ships of the Royal Navy have been named HMS Bann:

  was a 20-gun sixth rate launched in 1814 and sold in 1829
  was an iron paddle gunboat launched in 1856 and sold in 1873
   was a  launched in 1942 and transferred to the Royal Indian Navy as HMIS Tir in 1945. She was scrapped in 1979

Royal Navy ship names